MCA Airlines was a scheduled airline based in Stockholm, Sweden. It declared bankruptcy on November 11, 2009.

In 2009, MCA Airlines took over Air Express Sweden.

Destinations
MCA Airlines operated the following services (as of September 2009):

Cyprus
Larnaca (Larnaca International Airport)
Greece
Athens (Athens International Airport) [seasonal]
Thessaloniki (Thessaloniki International Airport, "Macedonia") [seasonal]
Iraq
Basra (Basra International Airport)
Erbil (Erbil International Airport)
Sulaymaniyah (Sulaimaniyah International Airport)
Lebanon
Beirut (Beirut Rafic Hariri International Airport)
Netherlands
Amsterdam (Amsterdam Airport Schiphol)
Norway
Oslo (Oslo Airport, Gardermoen)
Serbia
Niš (Niš Constantine the Great Airport) [planned to start December 14, 2009]
Sweden
Gothenburg (Göteborg Landvetter Airport)
Malmö (Malmö Airport)
Stockholm (Stockholm-Arlanda Airport)

Fleet

The MCA Airlines fleet included the following aircraft (as of June 2009):

1 Fokker 100
1 Airbus A320-200 (which is operated by SmartLynx Airlines)
2 Saab 2000

See also
 Airlines
 Transport in Sweden

Notes

External links

MCA Airlines

Defunct airlines of Sweden
Airlines established in 2008
Airlines disestablished in 2009

sv:MCA Airlines